The Hoxton is a "series of open-house hotels," owned by Ennismore.

History
The Hoxton brand was founded in 2006 by Sinclair Beecham, co-founder of Pret A Manger turned hotelier. It launched with The Hoxton, Shoreditch,  built on a former car park on Great Eastern Street in East London. In 2012, Ennismore, owned by Sharan Pasricha, acquired The Hoxton, Shoreditch and the brand to scale the business. In 2013, Ennismore embarked on a full brand reboot which included a refurbishment programme across the bedrooms and public areas and the addition of a multi-functional meeting and events space.

Pasricha has held the position of CEO since 2012.

Locations
The Hoxton opened its first site in Shoreditch in 2006, before expanding to Holborn in 2014, Amsterdam in 2015, and Paris in 2017.

They opened a further two hotels in 2018, one in Williamsburg and one in Portland.

The Hoxton's expansion continued in 2019, with settings in Chicago, Southwark, and Downtown Los Angeles, before a 2021 opening in Rome.

References

External links
 
 

Companies based in the London Borough of Hackney
Hotel chains
Hotels established in 2006